Keith Hartman (born 1966) is an American writer of speculative fiction and a self-described "struggling film-maker". He has also written non-fiction books on gay and lesbian issues. He has been nominated a number of times for the Gaylactic Spectrum Awards and Lambda Literary Award for LGBT literature.

Biography
Hartman was born in Huntsville, Alabama. He graduated from Princeton University, then went on to study at the London School of Economics, then started a PhD in Finance at Duke University. Sometime around his third year of the finance program, he decided to change careers and become a writer.

You Should Meet My Son!, Hartman's first feature film, appeared at LGBT film festivals in 2011 and is slated for DVD release later in the year.

Works

Fiction
 The Gumshoe, The Witch, & The Virtual Corpse (1999)
 Gumshoe Gorilla  - sequel. (2002)
 The Buried Sky (2011)

Non-fiction
 Congregations In Conflict - an examination of churches split over the issue of homosexuality.

Reception
F&SF reviewer Charles de Lint reported that "The Gumshoe, the Witch, and the Virtual Corpse is, like its title, a somewhat busy book, but there's enough payoff in characterization, story and ideas to make the trip through its pages a real pleasure."

Awards

The Gumshoe, The Witch, & The Virtual Corpse
 Chosen as one of the eight best mysteries of 1999 by The Drood Review of Mysteries.
 Winner of Two Gaylactic Spectrum Awards ("Best Novel" and "People's Choice")
 Nominated for two Lambda Awards ("Best Science Fiction / Fantasy Book" and "Best Men's Mystery".)

Gumshoe Gorilla
 Nominated for a Lambda Award ("Best Science Fiction / Fantasy / Horror Book".)

Congregations In Conflict
 1996 Lambda Award Nominee
 Number 2 on The Advocate's Bestseller List.

References

External links

 
 

21st-century American novelists
American male novelists
American science fiction writers
American gay writers
LGBT film directors
1966 births
Living people
American LGBT novelists
Date of birth missing (living people)
21st-century American male writers